NA-270 (Awaran-cum-Lasbela) was a constituency for the National Assembly of Pakistan.

Election 2002 

General elections were held on 10 Oct 2002. Pir Abdul Qadir Al-Gillani of PML-Q won by 40,156 votes.

Election 2008 

General elections were held on 18 Feb 2008. Jam Mir Mohammad Yousaf of PML-Q won by 50,476 votes.

Election 2013 

General elections were held on 11 May 2013. Jam Kamal Khan of PML-N won by 60,358 votes and became the member of National Assembly.

References

External links 
Election result's official website

NA-270
Abolished National Assembly Constituencies of Pakistan